The London Hammer (also known as the "London Artifact") is a name given to a hammer made of iron and wood that was found in London, Texas in 1936. Part of the hammer is embedded in a limey rock concretion, leading to it being regarded by some as an anomalous artifact, asking how a man-made tool could come to be encased in Lower Cretaceous rock.

History
The hammer was purportedly found by a local couple, Max Hahn and a female friend, while out walking along the course of the Red Creek near the town of London. They spotted a curious piece of loose rock with a bit of wood embedded in it and took it home with them. A decade later, their son Max broke open the rock to find the concealed hammerhead within.

The metal of the hammerhead consists of 96.6% iron, 2.6% chlorine, and 0.74% sulfur. 

The Hammer began to attract wider attention after it was bought by creationist Carl Baugh in 1983, who claimed the artifact was a "monumental 'pre-Flood' discovery." He has used it as the basis of speculation of how the atmospheric quality of a pre-flood earth could have encouraged the growth of giants. Baugh's Creation Evidence Museum purchased the hammer around 1983 and began to promote it as ‘the London Artifact’.

Other observers have noted that the hammer is stylistically consistent with typical American tools manufactured in the region in the late 19th century. Its design is consistent with a miner's hammer. One possible explanation for the rock containing the artifact is that the highly soluble minerals in the ancient limestone may have formed a concretion around the object, via a common process (like that of a petrifying well) which often creates similar encrustations around fossils and other nuclei in a relatively short time.

References

19th-century works
1936 archaeological discoveries
Creationism
Pseudoarchaeology
Hammers
Iron objects
Individual wooden objects